Diplothele is a genus of mygalomorph spider in the family Barychelidae, containing four species restricted to India and Sri Lanka.

Species
, the World Spider Catalog accepted the following species:

Diplothele gravelyi Siliwal, Molur & Raven, 2009 – India
Diplothele halyi Simon, 1892 – Sri Lanka
Diplothele tenebrosus Siliwal, Molur & Raven, 2009 – India
Diplothele walshi O. Pickard-Cambridge, 1890 – India

References 

Barychelidae
Mygalomorphae genera
Spiders of Asia